Mont kywe the  is a traditional Burmese snack or mont. It bears resemblance to the Indonesian and Malaysian kuih kosui and Filipino kutsinta.

This snack is a rice cake pudding made of rice flour, jaggery, salt, and alkaline limewater. After cooking, the pudding is served up in slices and garnished with coconut shavings. Mont kywe the uses rice flour milled from kauk kyan (ကောက်ကြမ်း), which has a high amylose content.

References

Burmese cuisine
Foods containing coconut
Steamed foods
Burmese desserts and snacks
Rice cakes